Knock railway station was on the Belfast and County Down Railway which ran from Belfast to Newcastle, County Down in Northern Ireland.

History

The station was opened by the Belfast and County Down Railway on 6 May 1850.

It was originally called Ballycloghan Halt, named after the neighbouring townland.

It gradually built up the number of trains it handled on a daily basis, with 2 a day in 1852, 4 a day in 1861 and 6 a day in 1868.

In 1869, the temporary booking office was replaced by proper brick station buildings and the halt's name was changed to Knock Station.

The platforms were 645 feet long and could be accessed from the King's Road via paths sloping down on either side of the track.

The station closed to passengers on 24 April 1950, by which time it had been taken over by the Ulster Transport Authority.

The former track bed now forms part of the Comber Greenway.

References 
 Knock : An Illustrated And Spoken History of Knock, East Belfast  - Aidan Campbell
 Belfast Street Directories 1852, 1861 & 1868  
 
 
 

Disused railway stations in County Down
Disused railway stations in Belfast
Railway stations opened in 1850
Railway stations closed in 1950
1850 establishments in Ireland
1950 disestablishments in Northern Ireland

Railway stations in Northern Ireland opened in 1850